This is a list of members of the Parliament of the German-speaking Community in Belgium during the 2009–2014 legislative session.

Composition

Leadership
The Bureau of the Parliament of the German-speaking Community consists of the following members:

Full members
The Parliament of the German-speaking Community consists of 25 full members that are directly elected by the inhabitants of the German-speaking Community for a term of office of 5 years. The last election was held in 2009 and the next one will take place in 2014.

One of the members is chosen to represent the Community in the federal Senate; the current Community senator is Louis Siquet (SP).

Advisory members
In addition to the directly elected members above, the Parliament of the German-speaking Community also comprises a number of members with an advisory vote. These are not actual members of the Parliament, but they do have the right to attend and participate in its meetings.

The advisory members are the Provincial Councillors of Liège, the members of the Walloon Parliament, the members of the Chamber of Representatives and the members of the Senate who reside in the German-speaking area of Belgium and have taken the oath of office in German, as well as the Member of the European Parliament elected by the German-speaking electoral college.

Notes

Sources
 
 

List
2009 in Belgium
2010s in Belgium